South Carolina Highway 68 may refer to:

South Carolina Highway 68, a state highway from Almeda to Yemassee
South Carolina Highway 68 (1937–1938), a former state highway from Clio to the North Carolina state line northeast of Clio
South Carolina Highway 68 (1938–1947), a former state highway in Denmark

068 (disambiguation)